The 14th Central American Championships in Athletics were held at the Estadio Nacional in San José, Costa Rica, between October 12-13, 2002. 

A total of 38 events were contested, 20 by men and 18 by women.

Participation
A total of 180 athletes from 7 countries were reported to participate:

 (65)
 (15)

 (8)
 (12)
 Panamá (24)

Medal summary
Results and medal winners were published.

Men

Women

Medal table (unofficial)

Team Ranking
Costa Rica won the overall team ranking.

Total

References

 
International athletics competitions hosted by Costa Rica
Central American Championships in Athletics
Central American Championships in Athletics
Central American Championships in Athletics
Sport in San José, Costa Rica
21st century in San José, Costa Rica